not to be confused with the Allen Correctional Institution, Lima, Ohio

Allen Correctional Center is a state prison in Allen Parish, Louisiana, United States. It is operated by the Louisiana Department of Public Safety and Corrections. The Louisiana Department of Corrections built the prison, which opened in December 1990, for $27 million.

References

1990 establishments in Louisiana
Allen Parish, Louisiana
GEO Group